Hot Damn or Hot Damn! may refer to:

Music
 "Hot Damn" (song), a 2003 single by Clipse from The Neptunes' compilation album The Neptunes Present... Clones

Albums
 Hot Damn! (Billy Lee Riley album), 1997
 Hot Damn! (Every Time I Die album), 2003
 Hot Damn! (Mojo Gurus album), 2006
 Hot Damn!, 2007 album by Haggis Horns, horn section backing Corinne Bailey Rae

Other
 Hot Damn, a book of essays by James W. Hall
 Hot Damn!, a hot cinnamon schnapps liqueur made by DeKuyper